Heintzleman Ridge is a  elevation mountain ridge located in the Boundary Ranges, in the U.S. state of Alaska. Juneau International Airport lies below the southwest tip of this ridge. Although modest in elevation, relief is significant since the ridge rises from sea-level in less than two miles, and it's set between Lemon Creek and Mendenhall Valley. Its nearest higher neighbor is Bullard Mountain,  to the north. Heintzleman Ridge is named for B. Frank Heintzleman (1888–1965), an American forester who was appointed Governor of Alaska Territory, from 1953 through 1957. In a way, he chose his own memorial, once casually remarking that, if anything were ever named for him, he hoped it would be "that ridge" which he admired for its beauty and splendor.
This geographic feature's name was officially adopted in 1966 by the U.S. Board on Geographic Names.

Climate

Based on the Köppen climate classification, Heintzleman Ridge is located in a subarctic climate zone with cold, snowy winters, and mild summers. Weather systems coming off the Gulf of Alaska are forced upwards by the Coast Mountains (orographic lift), causing heavy precipitation in the form of rainfall and snowfall. Temperatures can drop below −20 °C with wind chill factors below −30 °C. This climate supports the Juneau Icefield to the mountain's northeast. The month of July offers the most favorable weather for viewing and hiking this ridge.

See also

List of mountain peaks of Alaska
Geography of Alaska

References

External links
 Weather forecast: Heintzleman Ridge
 Heintzleman Ridge Trail: Tongass National Forest USDA

Mountains of Alaska
Mountains of Juneau, Alaska
Boundary Ranges